1682 Karel, provisional designation , is a stony Florian asteroid from the inner regions of the asteroid belt, approximately 7.5 kilometers in diameter.

It was discovered on 2 August 1949, by German astronomer Karl Reinmuth at Heidelberg Observatory in southern Germany, and later named after the son of Dutch astronomer couple Ingrid and Cornelis van Houten.

Orbit and classification 

Karel is a member of the Flora family, one of the largest collisional populations of stony asteroids in the inner main-belt. It orbits the Sun at a distance of 1.8–2.7 AU once every 3 years and 4 months (1,223 days). Its orbit has an eccentricity of 0.19 and an inclination of 4° with respect to the ecliptic.

Physical characteristics

Rotation period 

Astronomers François Colas, Jean Lecacheux, Federico Manzini and Raoul Behrend obtained a rotational lightcurve of Karel from photometric observations in January 2008. It gave a well-defined rotation period of 3.37485 hours with a brightness variation of 0.47 in magnitude. An identical period was modeled from the Lowell Photometric Database.

Diameter and albedo 

According to the survey carried out by the Japanese Akari satellite and NASA's Wide-field Infrared Survey Explorer with its subsequent NEOWISE mission, Karel measures 4.80 and 7.27 kilometers in diameter, and its surface has an albedo of 0.278 and 0.531, respectively. The Collaborative Asteroid Lightcurve Link assumes an albedo of 0.24 – derived from 8 Flora, the largest member and namesake of this family – and calculates a diameter of 7.47 kilometers based on an absolute magnitude of 12.8.

Naming 

This minor planet was named after Karel van Houten, son of Dutch astronomers Ingrid and Cornelis van Houten of the Leiden Observatory. Together with Ingrid, Reinmuth discovered the minor planet 1691 Oort in 1956. Reinmuth also named his two discoveries, 1673 van Houten and 1674 Groeneveld, after the prolific couple of Dutch astronomers. The official  was published by the Minor Planet Center on 15 December 1968.

References

External links 
 Asteroid Lightcurve Database (LCDB), query form (info )
 Dictionary of Minor Planet Names, Google books
 Asteroids and comets rotation curves, CdR – Observatoire de Genève, Raoul Behrend
 Discovery Circumstances: Numbered Minor Planets (1)-(5000) – Minor Planet Center
 
 

001682
Discoveries by Karl Wilhelm Reinmuth
Named minor planets
19490802